Lucy Sykes Rellie is a British-American entrepreneur, fashion executive, independent consultant and socialite based in New York City. She is most known for being the fashion director of Marie Claire from 2001 to 2007 and the fashion director of Rent the Runway from 2011 to 2012.

 Sykes Rellie, along with her husband Euan Rellie, are often praised by magazines for their dressing sense and style. In 2005, Telegraph called her and her sister Plum Sykes, "the Ultimate It Girls." The Times called her the New York's party queen in 2015.

After working in the fashion industry for over sixteen years, Sykes Rellie co-authored her first book entitled The Knockoff, in 2015. The book was praised by publications as well as critics and received a lot of media attention.

Early life and family 
Sykes Rellie was born in London, one of six children including a twin sister, Plum Sykes, and grew up in Sevenoaks, Kent. Sykes mother, Valerie Goad, was a dress designer. Sykes Rellie's grandfather, Christopher Sykes (1907–1986), whom she knew as "Fat Grandpa" or "F.G.", was a friend and official biographer (1975) of the novelist Evelyn Waugh and son of the diplomat Sir Mark Sykes, sixth baronet (1869–1919), associated with the so-called Sykes-Picot Agreement of 1916, by which Britain and France provided for the partition of the Ottoman Empire after the end of the First World War. An 18th century forebear, the second baronet, Sir Christopher Sykes (1749–1801), was a major figure in the enclosure movement that seized ownership of common land for private use.

In 1985 Sykes Rellie left Kent to attend the Italia Conti Academy of Theatre Arts.

Career 
In 1995, Sykes Rellie moved to New York and joined Marie Claire as a stylist. Her elder sister, Plum Sykes, also came to New York in 1997. While Sykes Rellie worked at Marie Claire, her sister worked at Vogue and the two sisters gained a lot of media attention for their style sense. The sisters became a familiar figure on the New York social scene, being frequently described as "It girls". The New York Times wrote that the two "took New York by storm." After working as a stylist and then as editor at Marie Claire, Sykes Rellie became the fashion director of the magazine in 2001.

Sykes Rellie launched her own children's clothing line, called the Lucy Sykes Baby in 2005. In 2007, after she had her second child, she left Marie Claire to give more time to her children and began working as a consultant for various fashion industry companies. In this role she worked with T. J. Maxx, Tommy Hilfiger and Ralph Lauren. She also spent time as a contributing fashion editor at Cookie, and as a stylist on staff at Allure and Town & Country.

In 2011, Sykes Rellie began working with Rent the Runway as a consultant. The company hired her as the fashion director in 2012, a position she held for one year. In this role she led the brand's styling, served as a designer liaison, and as a company spokesperson. In 2015, Sykes Rellie's first novel, The Knockoff co-authored with Jo Piazza, was published by Penguin Random House. Sykes Rellie and Piazza have announced that they will launch their second book, Fitness Junkie in 2017.

The Knockoff 
In 2015, Penguin Random House published The Knockoff co-written by Sykes Rellie and Jo Piazza. The novel tells the story of a fashionista struggling to stay ahead in the digital age. The protagonist of the novel, Imogen Tate, has been related to Sykes Rellie who came back to work after a long hiatus and found it hard to cope with the technological developments. The novel was initially titled "Tech Bitch", however, due to sensitivity around that harsh sounding name, the name of the novel was changed to The Knockoff. The book was sold as I Click Like This in Germany, and There Is No Glamour in Hell in Italy.

The Knockoff received positive reviews from publications and critics alike. Publishers Weekly called it "a winning romp of a tale" and Sydney Morning Herald called it "a sassy, timely and well-executed chick lit novel". While reviewing the book, Vanity Fair referred to the novel as a roman à clef, and called the story line "relatable to both the tech savvy and the tech wary."

Writing in The New York Times, Janet Maslin called it "[A] nicely executed bit of escapism." In 2016, it was announced that the novel will be made into a Bollywood movie.

Fitness Junkie 
In 2017, Penguin Random House will publish The Knockoff co-written, like her previous novel, by Sykes Rellie and Jo Piazza. The satirical novel tells the story of a female wedding dress designer, Janey Sweet, whose business partner terminates their relationship because Janey has gained weight. Janey then tries to lose weight, via a bizarre range of New York fitness rituals. Like The Knockoff, Fitness Junkie contains autobiographical and roman à clef elements.

Fitness Junkie has received positive early reviews.

Personal life 
She married Euan Rellie in May 2002. They have two sons, Heathcliff Felix Alastair Euan Rellie born 2003 and Titus Jasper Jake Icarus Rellie born 2007. Sister of Alice Sykes, Victoria Rowland, Thomas Sykes, Frederick Sykes and Joshua Sykes. Daughter of Mark Richard Sykes and Valerie Goad.

Bibliography 
The Knockoff (2015)
Fitness Junkie (2017)

References

External links 
Fitness Junkie
The Knockoff

Living people
1969 births
Date of birth missing (living people)
Alumni of the Italia Conti Academy of Theatre Arts
English fashion journalists
British women journalists
American fashion journalists
British socialites
American socialites
British emigrants to the United States